Colin Stephen Matthews CBE FREng (born 20 April 1956) is a British businessman, and the Chairman of Highways England, a position he has held since 2014; and EDF Energy.

Early life
He attended the independent Oundle School in north Northamptonshire. He is the son of Sir Peter Matthews, the former boss of Vickers, and was born in Canada. He holds dual Canadian-British nationality.

In 1977 he gained a First Class MA degree in Engineering from the University of Cambridge. In 1984 he gained an MBA from INSEAD, a famous business school in France. He became a Chartered Engineer.

Career
He started out on an engineering apprenticeship at Lucas Girling, a brakes manufacturer, in Birmingham, in 1977.

General Electric
He joined GE in 1988.

British Airways
In 1997 he became Managing Director of the engineering division of British Airways. As Technical Director, he left British Airways in 2001.

BAA
In 2008 he became Chief Executive of BAA plc, renamed Heathrow Airport Holdings in 2012. He announced his resignation from Heathrow Airport Holdings on 1 April 2014 when he announced he would leave the company later that year. Heathrow is Europe's busiest airport.

Highways England
On 21 July 2014 he was appointed as Chairman of the Highways Agency, which became Highways England in December 2014. He took up his position at the Highways Agency on 1 September 2014. As of 2015, Matthews was paid a salary of between £130,000 and £134,999 by the agency for his part-time rôle, making him one of the 328 most highly paid people in the British public sector at that time.

Personal life
He is married with four children. He has a French wife, Florence. In 2015 he became a Fellow of the Royal Academy of Engineering. He lives in the London Borough of Richmond upon Thames, with another house in France. He enjoys sailing in Cornwall. He is a devout Christian.

See also
 Jim O'Sullivan, Chief Executive of Highways England since July 2015, who also came from BAA plc, and a former Chief Engineer of Concorde.

References

External links
 Highways England
 Sunday Telegraph interview
 Royal Academy of Engineering

1956 births
British Airways people
Businesspeople in aviation
Commanders of the Order of the British Empire
English chief executives
Fellows of the Royal Academy of Engineering
Heathrow Airport Holdings
INSEAD alumni
People educated at Oundle School
People from Richmond, London
Living people